This article contains information about the literary events and publications of 1730.

Events
January 7 – The death of the Icelandic scholar Árni Magnússon activates the bequest to the University of Copenhagen in Denmark of the Arnamagnæan Manuscript Collection, which he has assembled.
January 8 – The Grub Street Journal is launched in London, with Richard Russel and John Martyn as editors. It lasts for 418 issues.
April 17 – Pietro Metastasio arrives in Vienna, where he settles permanently.
September/October – Colley Cibber becomes Poet Laureate of the Kingdom of Great Britain, in succession to Laurence Eusden.
December 11 – Voltaire's Brutus is finally staged.
unknown date – Romeo and Juliet becomes the first of Shakespeare's plays to be performed in America, when it is staged in New York City.

New books

Prose
Joseph Addison – The Evidences of the Christian Religion (posthumous)
John Bancks – The Weaver's Miscellany
Pierre François Xavier de Charlevoix – Histoire de l'Isle Espagnole ou de S. Domingue
Thomas Cooke as "Scriblerus Tertius" – The Candidates for the Bays
Yaakov Culi – Me'am Lo'ez
Philip Doddridge – Free Thoughts on the Most Probable Means of Reviving the Dissenting Interest
Johann Christoph Gottsched – Versuch einer kritischen Dichtkunst für die Deutschen
John Hervey, 2nd Baron Hervey – Observations on the Writings of the Craftsman
George Lyttelton, 1st Baron Lyttelton – An Epistle to Mr. Pope
Pierre des Maizeaux – Vie de Bayle
Isaac Rand – Index plantarum officinalium, quas ad materiae medicae scientiam promovendam, in horto Chelseiano (catalogue of plants in Chelsea Physic Garden)
Philip Johan von Strahlenberg – Das Nord- und Ostliche Theil von Europa und Asia (North and Eastern Parts of Europe and Asia)
Jonathan Swift – A Libel on D—— D——, and a Certain Great Lord
Matthew Tindal – Christianity as Old as Creation
William Whiston – Life of Samuel Clarke
William Wotton (posthumous) – A Discourse Concerning the Confusion of Languages at Babel
Edward Young – Two Epistles to Mr. Pope

Drama
Theophilus Cibber – Patie and Peggy (opera)
Henry Fielding
The Author's Farce
Rape upon Rape
The Temple Beau
Tom Thumb
Charles Johnson – The Tragedy of Medea
George Lillo – Sylvia
Pierre de Marivaux – The Game of Love and Chance
 Benjamin Martyn – Timoleon
James Miller – The Humours of OxfordJohn Mottley – The Widow BewitchedGabriel Odingsells – Bayes's OperaJames Ralph – The Fashionable LadyJames Thomson – Sophonisba Edward Ward – The Prisoner's OperaPoetry
Stephen Duck – Poems on Several Subjects (including "The Thresher's Labour")
Matthew Pilkington – Poems on Several OccasionsElizabeth Thomas – The Metamorphosis of the TownJames Thomson – The SeasonsSee also 1730 in poetryBirths
March 27 – Thomas Tyrwhitt, English critic (died 1786)
April 1 – Salomon Gessner, Swiss painter and poet (died 1788)
August 20 – Paul Henri Mallet, Swiss historian (died 1807)
November 10 – Oliver Goldsmith, Anglo-Irish poet and dramatist (died 1774)
December 6 – Sophie von La Roche (Maria Sophie Gutermann von Gutershofen), German novelist (died 1807)unknown datesThomas Marryat, English medical writer and physician (died 1792)
Joakim Stulić, Croatian lexicographer (died 1817)
Tarikonda Venkamamba, Telugu poet (died 1817)probable year'' – Charlotte Lennox, Gibraltar-born Scottish novelist and poet (died 1804)

Deaths
January 7 – Árni Magnússon, Icelandic scholar (born 1663)
February 9 – Johann Georg von Eckhart, German historian (born 1664)
March 20 – Adrienne Lecouvreur, French actress (born 1692)
July 16 – Elijah Fenton, English poet (born 1683)
August 16 – Laurence Echard, English historian (born c. 1670)
September 14 – Sophia Elisabet Brenner, Swedish poet and writer (born 1659)
September 27 – Laurence Eusden, English Poet Laureate (born 1688)
October 23 – Anne Oldfield, English actress (born 1683)
November – Nedîm, Ottoman poet (born c. 1680; killed in the Patrona Halil uprising
December 31 – Carlo Gimach, Maltese architect, engineer and poet (born 1651)

References

 
Years of the 18th century in literature